The 1893–94 Scottish Division Two was the first season of play in the Scottish Football League Division Two.

It was won by Hibernian, with Thistle finishing bottom.

Table

References 

 Scottish Football Archive

Scottish Division Two seasons
2